Sea-Land or Sealand can refer to either:

Sea-Land Service, container shipping company
Principality of Sealand, North Sea micronation
Rånrike's Saevo mountain range, translated as "sea land"

See also
Seeland Records, record company named for Sealand
Zealand, the largest island in Denmark